Riddle Run is a tributary of the Allegheny River located in Allegheny County in the U.S. state of Pennsylvania.

Course

Riddle Run joins the Allegheny River at the borough of Springdale.

See also

 List of rivers of Pennsylvania
 List of tributaries of the Allegheny River
 Rachel Carson was born and raised in Springdale.

References

External links

U.S. Geological Survey: PA stream gaging stations

Rivers of Pennsylvania
Tributaries of the Allegheny River
Rivers of Allegheny County, Pennsylvania